Divisional admiral is a commissioned officer rank used in the navies of Belgium and Italy.

It is rated OF-7 within the NATO ranking system and is equivalent to rear admiral in the Royal Navy and rear admiral (upper half) in the United States Navy.

Belgium

Divisional admiral is a rank used by the Belgian Naval Component. It ranks directly above a flotilla admiral and immediately below a vice-admiral. It is equivalent to a major general in the Belgian Land Component, Air Component and Medical Component.

Italy

Divisional admiral is a rank used by the Italian Navy. It ranks directly above a counter admiral and immediately below a squadron admiral. It is equivalents to divisional general the Italian Army and the Air Force. In addition, another designation is vice admiral just like the vice-amiral of the French Navy.

See also
Divisional General
Division (naval)

References

External links
Website of the Belgian Naval Component
Website of the Marina Militare

Naval ranks
Admirals
Military ranks of Belgium
Military ranks of Italy
Two-star officers